Hiya Diya Niya is a 2000 Indian Assamese romantic drama movie directed by Munin Barua and produced under Pooja Motion Pictures. Music was composed by Zubeen Garg. It was released on 25 February 2000. This film marked Assamese's first film to be shot outside India.

Hiya Diya Niya was the biggest blockbuster which also helped to revive the Assamese film industry that went into down fall.

Synopsis
A rich family searches for a husband for their daughter. The father wants his daughter to marry his friend's son who lives in a village, but the mother and daughter prefer an NRI boy.

Cast
Jatin Bora as Dipu/Dulal
Luna Lahkar as Momi
Ravi Sarma as Abinash
Geetawali Rajkumari as Sunita
Pranjal Saikia as Niren
Mridula Baruah as Runu
Hiranya Das as Sunny
Chetana Das
Nipon Goswami
Pankaj Mahanta
Jayanta Bhagawati

Soundtrack

The music of Hiya Diya Niya was composed by Zubeen Garg. It was his first film as a music director along with his another film Tumi Mur Mathu Mur. Lyrics were by Hemanta Dutta, Diganta Kalita and Jimoni Choudhury. The singers who lent their voices in this film are Zubeen Garg, Queen Hazarika, Malobika Bora, Tarali Sarma, Santa Uzir, Diganta Bharati and Debojit Chowdhury. The album contains 8 total tracks on Audio Cassette and 9 total tracks (8 main tracks + 1 hidden track) on Audio CD. All the songs were very much popular among the masses.

Notes
 After the final listed track (i.e., Track 8 or "Mitha Mitha"), there are approximately 5 minutes of silences, then the Untitled Background Score (Hidden Track) appears which was sung by Zubeen Garg, Shaan and Sagarika.

References

External links 

 

Assamese-language films
Films set in Assam
2000 films
Films directed by Munin Barua
2000s Assamese-language films